The 2017 Reno 1868 FC season is the club's inaugural season of existence, and their first in the United Soccer League, the second tier of American soccer.

Background 
Ahead of the 2017 season, there had been three professional soccer clubs in Northern Nevada: Reno Rattlers, Northern Nevada Aces, and Nevada Wonders. The announcement of an expansion franchise to join the USL was announced in September 2015.

The club's named was decided with a contest known as "USL Reno 2017". Nearly 5,000 entries were submitted, followed by fans choosing from amongst the top six names: Reno FC, FC Reno, Reno Silver FC, Reno City FC, Reno United, or Reno 1868. The fans response refined the contest down to three finalists—Reno FC, Reno United, and Reno 1868—with the winner being Reno 1868, a nod to the founding year of the City of Reno.

On June 29, 2016, the club announced a two-year partnership with the San Jose Earthquakes of MLS.  It was also stated that San Jose would have control over the technical side of the club. The team hired Earthquakes Assistant Coach Ian Russell as Head Coach on November 22, 2016.

Transfers

Transfers in

Transfers out

Squad

Non-competitive

Preseason

Midseason friendlies

Competitive

USL

Standings

Results

USL Playoffs

First round

U.S. Open Cup

Statistics

Awards

See also 
 2017 San Jose Earthquakes season

References 

Reno 1868 FC
Reno 1868 FC
Reno 1868 FC seasons
Reno 1868 FC